The Higher Law is a 1914 American silent drama film directed by Charles Giblyn and featuring Murdock MacQuarrie, Pauline Bush and Lon Chaney. It was written by Harry G. Stafford, based on a story by George Bronson Howard. This film was the second in a series of four films called The Adventures of Francois Villon. Lon Chaney was featured in this one, as well as in the first installment, The Oubliette (1914), but did not appear in the other two. The film is now considered to be lost.

Plot
The King of France, Louis XI, extends an offer of peace to Edward IV of England. King Edward's treacherous advisor, Sir Stephen (Lon Chaney), advises him to reject the offer. King Louis asks Francois Villon for his advice, and Villon tells the king that he should get rid of Sir Stephen once and for all. Villon travels to England to deal with the problem and hires a beautiful young woman (the Lady Eleyne) to seduce Sir Stephen. She lures him to her father's castle where he is made to look like a prowler, and Villon and his men execute him. Villon then returns to France to facilitate the peace treaty, free of Sir Stephen's interference.

Cast
 Murdock MacQuarrie as François Villon
 Pauline Bush as Lady Eleyne
 Doc Crane as King Louis XI
 Lon Chaney as Sir Stephen Fitz Allen
 Millard K. Wilson
 Chester Withey (aka Chet Withey)
 Jessalyn Van Trump

Reception
Moving Picture World wrote: "This is the second of the series being produced by Charles Giblyn, picturing scenes in the life of the vagabond poet, Francois Villon. Murdock MacQuarrie has the name part and Pauline Bush and Lon Chaney are also in the cast. In this number Villon acts as the emissary of Louis XI, and by his wits succeeds in luring to destruction Sir Stephen, favorite of Edward IV. The atmosphere and costuming are good, and the final scenes dramatic and stirring. Villon appears to advantage in his more poetical aspects. In this incident he is a little too much of the villain. But the prediction is a commendable one, and above the average in general construction."
 
Motion Picture News wrote: "The director, Charles Giblyn, has proven himself worthy of great praise. The old costumes and castles, the joviality of the tap-room, the dignified and stately action of the court followers, all lend a decidedly mediaeval atmosphere to the picture...but the picture does not rely solely on its meritorious costumes and atmosphere for success. There is sufficient scheming, brawls, duel scenes and the like to appease the appetites of the keen lovers of sensationalism, and those who would not be content with the great character study that the picture offers."

References

External links

1914 films
1914 short films
1914 drama films
1914 lost films
American silent short films
American black-and-white films
Lost American films
Films directed by Charles Giblyn
Films about François Villon
Silent American drama films
Cultural depictions of François Villon
Cultural depictions of Louis XI of France
Lost drama films
Universal Pictures short films
1910s American films
1910s English-language films